Marcelo Enrique Corrales García (born 20 February 1971) is a Chilean former professional footballer who played as a striker.

Club career
Born in Santiago, Corrales formerly played for Palestino, Universidad Católica, Temuco, Provincial Osorno, Santiago Wanderers, Unión San Felipe, Al-Shabab, Universidad de Chile, Puerto Montt, Coquimbo Unido and Municipal Iquique. In 2010, he retired from football after playing for Coquimbo Unido, but he returned to the activity by joining San Antonio Unido in the Tercera A in 2012.

Corrales is seventh on the list of all-time Chilean top scorers.

International career
Corrales made two appearances for the Chile national team at the Copa América 2001, scoring one goal.

Personal life
His son, Joan, is a former footballer who was in the Coquimbo Unido youth ranks and played for Swedish side Rågsveds IF in 2019.

References

External links
Corrales at Football Lineups

1971 births
Living people
Footballers from Santiago
Chilean footballers
Chilean expatriate footballers
Chile international footballers
Club Deportivo Palestino footballers
Club Deportivo Universidad Católica footballers
Deportes Temuco footballers
Provincial Osorno footballers
Santiago Wanderers footballers
Unión San Felipe footballers
Al Shabab Al Arabi Club Dubai players
Universidad de Chile footballers
Puerto Montt footballers
Coquimbo Unido footballers
Deportes Iquique footballers
San Antonio Unido footballers
Chilean Primera División players
UAE Pro League players
Primera B de Chile players
Tercera División de Chile players
2001 Copa América players
Chilean expatriate sportspeople in the United Arab Emirates
Expatriate footballers in the United Arab Emirates
Association football forwards